Black Rose is a 2014 cooperative American and Russian action film directed by, and starring, Alexander Nevsky. The film also stars Kristanna Loken, Adrian Paul, and Robert Davi. The film was released on 25 January 2014 in Russia. It was made on a budget of $7,000,000.

Premise 
In Los Angeles, several Russian girls have been murdered. Police cannot find the killer. For this reason, the Russian police officer Vladimir Kazatov comes to LA. Together with his American partner Emily Smith, he proceeds to investigate these crimes.

Cast 
 Alexander Nevsky as Vladimir Kazatov
 Kristanna Loken as Emily Smith
 Adrian Paul as Matt Robinson 
 Robert Davi as Captain Frank Dalano
 Matthias Hues as Black Mask Killer
Hafedh Dakhlaoui as Max
 Emmanuil Vitorgan as Colonel Gromov
 Robert Madrid as Antonio Banuelos
 Oksana Sidorenko as Sandra
 Dmitriy Bikbaev as Gary
 Olga Rodionova as Natalya

Production 
The film was shot in Moscow (Russia) and in Los Angeles (United States).

External links 
 
 
 
  
 Review of film 
 Review of film 

2014 films
2014 direct-to-video films
2014 crime action films
Russian crime action films
American crime action films
American serial killer films
English-language Russian films
2010s Russian-language films
Russian multilingual films
Russian vigilante films
2010s vigilante films
American multilingual films
Direct-to-video action films
2014 multilingual films
2014 directorial debut films
2010s English-language films
2010s American films